Weavers of Fortune is a 1922 British silent sports film directed by Arthur Rooke and starring Henry Vibart, Dacia and Derek Glynne.

Cast
 Henry Vibart as Jackson  
 Dacia as Minna Vandyck  
 Derek Glynne as Tom Winter  
 Myrtle Vibart as Molly Jackson

References

Bibliography
 Low, Rachael. History of the British Film, 1918-1929. George Allen & Unwin, 1971.

External links
 

1922 films
1920s sports drama films
British sports drama films
British silent short films
Films directed by Arthur Rooke
British horse racing films
British black-and-white films
1922 drama films
1920s English-language films
1920s British films
Silent sports drama films